Courtney Stanhope Kenny (18 March 1847 – 18 March 1930) was a British jurist, academic and Liberal politician. He sat in the House of Commons from 1885 to 1888, and was later Downing Professor of the Laws of England at Downing College, University of Cambridge. He is buried with his family in the Parish of the Ascension Burial Ground in Cambridge.

Early life and career
Kenny was born on the Wirral, the son of William Fenton Kenny J.P. of Halifax and Ripon and his wife Agnes Ralph, daughter of John Rhodes Ralph J.P. of Halifax. He was educated at the Heath and Hipperholme grammar schools and joined a firm of solicitors in 1863. In 1869 he became a partner but decided to leave and pursue a university education, entering Downing College, Cambridge in 1871. His career at university was particularly brilliant; in 1872 he was awarded a scholarship, in 1874 he was senior in the law and history tripos, won the Winchester Reading Prize, and was elected president of the union. In 1875, he won the chancellor's medal for legal studies.

Kenny was elected a fellow of Downing College in 1875 and was appointed to a lecturership in law and moral science.  In three successive years, 1877, 1878, 1879, he submitted an essay which won him thrice the Yorke Prize; the essays were on the history of the law of primogeniture (jointly with Perceval Maitland Laurence), the law relating to married women's property, and the law of charities.

In 1881 Kenny was called to the bar at Lincoln's Inn and joined the south-eastern circuit.

Political career
At the 1885 general election Kenny was elected Member of Parliament (MP) for the Barnsley division of Yorkshire, and at the general election of June 1886 he was again returned as a Liberal. While in parliament he introduced bills for the abolition of primogeniture and for the amendment of the law relating to blasphemy, which demanded the repeal of the laws restricting the expression of religious opinion.

Cambridge Professor
In 1888 Kenny became university reader of English law at Cambridge University, and resigned from parliament to concentrate on work at the university. In 1907 he was elected to replace the recently deceased Frederic William Maitland as Downing Professor of the Laws of England, a position he held until his retirement in 1918. He died in Cambridge aged 83. Two student residence buildings at Downing College are named in his honour.

Selected bibliography
 The Law of England on the Effects of Marriage on Property, Yorke Prize 1877
 The History of the Law of Primogeniture, Yorke Prize 1878
 The true principles of legislation with regard to property given for charitable or other public uses or Endowed Charities, Yorke Prize 1879?1880
 A Selection of Cases Illustrative of English Criminal Law, 1901
 A selection of cases illustrative of the English law of tort, 1908
 Outlines of Criminal Law, 1902, textbook with at least 19 re-editions to 1966, 
 including, with James H. Webb, an American edition in 1907

Family
Kenny married Emily Gertrude Wiseman (2 July 1849 – 27 November 1929) daughter of William Wood Wiseman M.R.C.S. of Ossett, Yorkshire in 1876. They had two daughters, Gertrude (died 9 September 1958) and Agnes (died 11 January 1966); all are buried together in the Parish of the Ascension Burial Ground in Cambridge.

References

External links 
 
 

1847 births
1930 deaths
Alumni of Downing College, Cambridge
Fellows of Downing College, Cambridge
Liberal Party (UK) MPs for English constituencies
UK MPs 1885–1886
UK MPs 1886–1892
Members of Lincoln's Inn
People educated at Heath Grammar School
Presidents of the Cambridge Union
English legal writers
English legal scholars
British legal scholars
British legal writers
Fellows of the British Academy
Downing Professors of the Laws of England